Cristina Eugenia Medina Conde (Seville;  April 8, 1971) is a Spanish actress, singer and theater producer. Known for her role as Nines Chacón in the Telecinco series La que se avecina.

Biography 
She worked for theater companies such as Atalaya, TNT, or Centro Andaluz de Teatro until 1997, when she formed, together with Joan Estrader, the humor theater company Pez en Raya. Which she used to get seven titles that have been all over the world and have won national and international awards.

Cristina Medina founded her own production company, LaMedinaEs, in 2014 and is the creator of shows. Debuting in music with the show A Grito Pelao, a mixture of absurd humor and rock that deserved the creation of the band La Cristi & los que vengan, they are currently working on the creation of the first album to be called Gloria para ti.

In 2017, the company embarks on the co-production of the play Ay, Carmela!, directed by Fernando Soto and performed by herself along with Santiago Molero.

Between 2008 and 2021, she appeared in the Telecinco series La que se avecina in which she plays Nines Chacón in the second season.

On September 25, 2021, she announced to her Instagram followers that she has breast cancer.

Filmography

Television 
Series

Programs

Theater

Awards 

 1996: Award for Best Andalusian Actress with Miles Gloriosus (TNT).
 2003: Audience Award for Best Show at the IX International Festival of Humor in Madrid with Tápate (Pez en Raya).
 2003: Prize to the best show of the season in Bath and Winchester with Pésame mucho (Pez en Raya).
 2004: Prize to the best show at the XXI Feria de Teatro de Tárrega with Sólala (Pez en Raya).
 2005: Award to the best show at the XI International Festival of Humor of Madrid (Pez en Raya).
 2018: Award for best show at the Palma de Río Theater Fair with ¡Ay, Carmela! (LaMedinaEs Company).

References 

Spanish television actresses
Living people
1971 births